Callimormus radiola, the radiant skipper, is a species of skipper butterfly in the family Hesperiidae. It is found in southern Mexico, Ecuador, Brazil, Colombia and Argentina.

Subspecies
Callimormus radiola radiola (southern Mexico to southern Brazil)
Callimormus radiola elegans Hayward, 1938 (Ecuador)
Callimormus radiola janna Evans, 1955 (Colombia)
Callimormus radiola pusillus Hayward, 1934 (Argentina)

References

External links 

 
 Callimormus elegans at Animal Diversity Web

Hesperiinae
Butterflies described in 1878
Hesperiidae of South America
Butterflies of North America
Taxa named by Paul Mabille